Mogadishu University is an accredited non-state university in Mogadishu, Somalia.

History
The idea to establish an educational institution started in June 1997, after which time it took five years to develop and open the university. It opened in September 1997 as a non-governmental, non-profit institution for higher learning, governed by a Board of Trustees and a University Council.

Mogadishu University has relocated its activities to its Main campus on the outskirts of Mogadishu.

The main campus in Mogadishu was initiated with the assistance of the Islamic Development Bank, among other donors. In 2008, Mogadishu University opened another campus in Bosaso in the northeastern Puntland state of Somalia, which recently formed into an independent University called Red Sea University in Somalia.

The institution has been invited to join the Somali Aid Coordination Body (SACB) Educational Sector Committee. On 21 September 2004, the MU representatives Mr Fathudin Mohamed, Westley Bii and Hussein M. Iman (MU Program Director) attended the SACB Educational Sector Committee meeting in Nairobi, Kenya.

Two delegates from MU, Dr. Abdurahman Moalim Abdullahi, the Chairman of Board of Trustees and Dr Abdullahi Farah Asseyr, MD, Adviser of the President and Head of faculty of Health Sciences Affairs at MU, paid a 10-day visit to Norway during which they signed a partnership agreement with the University of Tromsø.

Admission 
The university accepts students who have graduated from secondary schools or those who have GCE equivalent certificates. Before enrolment, students have to pass a qualifying examinations (oral and written) in order to enroll in their program of study.

Institutes and centers
University institutes and centers are:

 The Institute for Somali Studies (ISOS)
 Institute of Peace and Environment
 The Institute of Languages
 The Center for Community Services and Continuing Education
 MU Legal Clinic
 Somali Center for Water & Environment
 Mother & Child Educational Care (MCEC)
 Media Training Center (MTC)
 Research Unit
 MU-IRB
 Radio Himilo

Faculties 
The university has nine faculties, which award BA and B.Sc degrees. The university's faculties are:

Faculty of Sharia and Law
Faculty of Education and Humanities
Faculty of Economics & Management Sciences
Faculty of Health Sciences
Faculty of Computer Science & Information Technology
Faculty of Political Sciences & Public Administration
Faculty of Engineering    
Faculty of Medicine 
Faculty of Agriculture
Faculty of Veterinary
Faculty of Dentistry

Post-graduate Program 
MU offers its own post-graduate programs as well as in conjunction with the Omdurman Islamic University in Sudan, Malaysia Open University and Asian e-University.

Accreditation
Mogadishu University has accreditation with:

Minister of Education, Culture and Higher Education
 The Board of the Intergovernmental Organization EDU.

References

External links

 Official website

 
Universities in Somalia

Educational institutions established in 1997
1997 establishments in Somalia